The 2017–18 UConn Huskies men's basketball team represented the University of Connecticut in the 2017–18 NCAA Division I men's basketball season. The Huskies were led by sixth-year head coach Kevin Ollie. The Huskies split their home games between the XL Center in Hartford, Connecticut, and the Harry A. Gampel Pavilion on the UConn campus in Storrs, Connecticut as members of the American Athletic Conference. They finished the season 14–18, 7–11 in AAC play to finish in eighth place. They lost in the first round of the AAC tournament to SMU.

The school announced on January 26, 2018, that the NCAA was investigating recruitment of at least three basketball players for possible recruiting violations. On March 10, the school fired head coach Kevin Ollie for just cause related to the NCAA investigation. On March 22, 2018, it was announced that the school had hired Dan Hurley as head coach. On July 2, 2019, the wins for the 2017–18 season were vacated due to NCAA Sanctions.

Previous season 
The Huskies finished the 2016–17 season 16–17, 9–9 in AAC play to finish in a tie for fifth place. They defeated South Florida and Houston to advance to the semifinals of the AAC tournament where they lost to Cincinnati.

Offseason

Departures

Incoming transfers

2017 recruiting class

|}

Preseason
At the conference's annual media day, the Huskies were picked to finish in sixth place in the AAC. Junior guard Jalen Adams was named to the preseason All-AAC first team.

Roster

Schedule and results

|-
!colspan=12 style=|Exhibition
|-

|-
!colspan=12 style=|Regular season
|-

|-
!colspan=12 style=|American Athletic Conference tournament

References

UConn Huskies men's basketball seasons
Connecticut
UConn
UConn